Eino Kaipainen (1899–1995) was a Finnish actor.

Selected filmography
 Katariina ja Munkkiniemen kreivi (1943)
 North Express (1947)
 The General's Fiancée (1951)
 Song of Warsaw (1953)
 After the Fall of Man (1953)
 Esa Flies to Kuopio (1953)
 It Began in the Rain (1953)

References

Bibliography 
 Goble, Alan. The Complete Index to Literary Sources in Film. Walter de Gruyter, 1999.

External links 
 

1899 births
1995 deaths
People from Pieksämäki
People from Mikkeli Province (Grand Duchy of Finland)
Finnish male film actors
Finnish military personnel of World War II